A constitutional referendum was held in Armenia on 5 July 1995. The changes to the constitution were approved by 70.3% of voters, with a turnout of 55.6%.

Results

References

1995 referendums
1995 in Armenia
1995
Constitutional referendums
Constitutional history of Armenia